Daniel Carmichael (born 21 June 1990) is a Scottish professional footballer, who last played for Gretna 2008 as a midfielder.

Carmichael has played previously for Queen of the South in two spells, Hibernian, Cumnock Juniors, Workington and East Kilbride.

Career

Early career
After playing as a youth with home-town club Queen of the South, Carmichael joined Workington whilst the club ran a Football Development Centre in tandem with the University of Central Lancashire. Carmichael debuted for the first-team for the Cumbrian club in a Conference North match versus Worcester City in January 2007.

Workington reserve team manager, Stuart Rome, left the club in 2008 to take charge of the newly formed Gretna 2008, with Carmichael following him to the East of Scotland Football League club. As well as featuring for the East of Scotland Select team whilst at Gretna, Carmichael was also called into the England Colleges squad.

Queen of the South (First spell)

It was announced on 30 April 2010 that Carmichael would sign for Queen of the South on a two-year contract. This would take effect after the last game of Gretna's season on 13 May 2010. Carmichael's league debut for Queens was the season opening 1–0 defeat away to Dundee. Carmichael's first league goal for the Doonhamers arrived in the home defeat the week after versus Raith Rovers. Carmichael was named in the Second Division team of the year for 2012–13 by PFA Scotland, as he helped Queens win promotion and the 2012–13 Scottish Challenge Cup.

In announcing his departure from the club on 2 June 2015, Carmichael had started 142 first-team matches and had 54 substitute appearances, scoring 15 goals.

Hibernian
On 2 June 2015, Carmichael signed a two-year deal with Hibernian. Carmichael's appearances were restricted during the early part of the 2015–16 season due to an abdominal injury. Carmichael departed Easter Road by mutual consent in August 2016, having made nine appearances in total for the club.

Queen of the South (Second spell)
After leaving Hibernian, Carmichael was signed once again for Queens, until the end of the 2016–17 season.

On 18 May 2017, Carmichael signed a new one-year contract with Queens.

Carmichael's appearances were thwarted by injury problems during his second spell at Palmerston and he was released by the Dumfries club at the end of the  2017-18 season.

Cumnock Juniors
In August 2018, Carmichael joined Junior club Cumnock Juniors after a successful trial period.

Workington
On 30 January 2019, Carmichael signed for Workington until 31 May 2019, where he played on four occasions for the first-team.

East Kilbride
During the 2019 close season, Carmichael signed for East Kilbride.

Gretna 2008
Carmichael returned to Gretna 2008 for a second spell in 2020.

Career statistics

Honours
Queen of the South
Scottish Second Division: 2012–13
Scottish Challenge Cup: 2012–13

References

External links 

1990 births
Living people
Scottish footballers
Association football forwards
Workington A.F.C. players
Gretna F.C. 2008 players
Queen of the South F.C. players
Hibernian F.C. players
Cumnock Juniors F.C. players
Footballers from Dumfries
Scottish Football League players
Scottish Professional Football League players
Scottish Junior Football Association players
East Kilbride F.C. players